White Earth/White Earths may refer to:

Anthropology
 Zaculeu ("White Earth"), pre-classic city of the Mam-Maya of Guatemala (Saqulew in modern orthography)
 Saqulewab, "White Earths", referring to the Mam people in the Popol Vuh

United States
 White Earth, Minnesota, a census-designated place
 White Earth Indian Reservation in Minnesota
 White Earth Band of Ojibwe
 White Earth River (Minnesota)
 White Earth, North Dakota, a small city
 White Earth River (North Dakota)

Science
 A special case derived from Earth climate simulations whereby the Earth is plunged into a state of total glaciation. Seems to provide statistical support for the Snowball Earth (also known as "White Earth") theory.

Entertainment
 The White Earth, a Miles Franklin Award-winning novel by Andrew McGahan
 White Earth (film), a documentary film nominated for an Academy Award